Antonín Cyril Stojan (22 May 1851 – 29 September 1923) was a Czech Roman Catholic prelate who served as the Archbishop of Olomouc from 1921 until his death. He was a politician prior to this and served in several political capacities while also serving as a pastor in several parishes where he strengthened social and charitable activities.

He was titled as Venerable on 14 June 2016 after Pope Francis confirmed his heroic virtue on the path to sainthood.

Life
Antonín Stojan was born in 1851 in Beňov as the fifth of eight children to parents František and Josefa.

Stojan studied in both Kroměříž and Olomouc in preparation for the priesthood and received his ordination in 1876 from Cardinal Friedrich von Furstenburg; he served as a chaplain after his ordination in Příbor and was there for about a decade. From 1888 to 1909 he served as a pastor at Dražovice. He also served as the canon of the Olomouc Cathedral from 1917 and the provost of the Saint Maurice Kromeriz institute for seminarians.

On 10 March 1921 he received an appointment from Pope Benedict XV as the newest Archbishop of Olomouc, succeeding Lev Skrbenský z Hříště, and he received his episcopal consecration on the next 3 April from the then-Archbishop (future cardinal) Clemente Micara. He was installed in his new episcopal see and set to work organizing a range of charitable and social associations for the archdiocese while forming a charitable archdiocesan initiative in 1922. He also oversaw the restoration and the enhancement of places of pilgrimage such as the Velehrad Jesuit church. Stojan ordained as a priest the future Cardinal František Tomášek in 1922 and conferred episcopal consecration upon Bishop Josef Schinzel in 1923.

Stojan died in Olomouc on 29 September 1923 after he suffered from a brain aneurism on 11 May 1923.

Beatification process

The beatification cause opened with an informative process in Olomouc on 14 July 1965, and he became titled as a Servant of God while the process ended sometime later prior to the Congregation for the Causes of Saints validating the process in Rome in February 1996. However the official start to the cause came under Pope John Paul II later that month with the formal declaration of the "nihil obstat". The confirmation that Stojan led a life of heroic virtue allowed for Pope Francis to title him as Venerable on 14 June 2016.

See also
 Roman Catholic Archdiocese of Olomouc

References

Further reading

External links
 Hagiography Circle
 Catholic Hierarchy

1851 births
1923 deaths
People from Přerov District
People from the Margraviate of Moravia
Archbishops of Olomouc
KDU-ČSL politicians
Members of the Austrian House of Deputies (1897–1900)
Members of the Austrian House of Deputies (1901–1907)
Members of the Austrian House of Deputies (1907–1911)
Members of the Austrian House of Deputies (1911–1918)
Members of the Revolutionary National Assembly of Czechoslovakia
Members of the Senate of Czechoslovakia (1920–1925)
Members of the Moravian Diet
Czech archbishops
Roman Catholic archbishops in Czechoslovakia
Venerated Catholics by Pope Francis
19th-century venerated Christians
20th-century venerated Christians
Deaths from intracranial aneurysm